Le Père de nos pères is a novel, by Bernard Werber, released in 1998. It is the first volume in the trilogy of Lucrèce et Isidore, named for the two main characters.

In this book, Werber deals with the origins of humankind through two new characters, Isidore Katzenberg and Lucrèce Nemrod. He puts forward an alternative and surprising idea for the transitional fossil in the evolution of humanity, also called the Missing Link theory.

Summary 
The plot takes place mainly in the present, when Professor Adjemian, a palaeontogist, is murdered. Before he died, Adjemian claimed to know the answer to the fundamental question: “Where do we come from?” Lucrèce Nemrod, a young reporter, covers this case and decides to find out why the professor was murdered after  the police close the case. For her article, Lucrèce asks Isidore Katzenberg, a former scientific journalist, for help. Isodore and Lucrèce  leave for Africa in order to uncover a secret for which some people are ready to kill.

Simultaneously, a second plot, becomes entwined with the investigation. This second story takes place "somewhere in East Africa", 3.7 million years ago. It deals with the life of a cave man known simply as "He".

The suspense is very intense until it reaches the last word of the book which reveals the identity of the Missing Link. The literary genres of crime fiction, scientific journalism, adventure, biography, philosophical fiction and others are intermingled in Bernard Werber's typical style.

Editions 
 Albin Michel, 1998
 LGF, collection Le Livre de Poche, 2000

References

External links
Bernard Werber's official website.

1998 French novels
1998 science fiction novels
Novels by Bernard Werber
French science fiction novels
Éditions Albin Michel books